The Carlsberg European Ladies' Championship was a series of women's professional golf tournaments on the Ladies European Tour (LET) held throughout England, Scotland and Wales between 1979 and 1981.

In 1978 Carlsberg became the main sponsor of the newly formed Women's Professional Golfers' Association (WPGA), supporting 12 tournaments in 1979, 10 in 1980 and 4 in 1981. The winner's share per tournament was £200, £250 and £1,500 respectively for the three seasons. Initially a 36-hole stroke play event, it was extended to 54-hole stroke play in 1981.

Carlsberg ended their sponsorship after the 1981 season.

Winners
"Date" is the ending date of the tournament. The numbers in brackets after multiple winners' names show the number of Carlsberg tournament wins they had up to and including that event.

Sources:

References

External links
Ladies European Tour

Former Ladies European Tour events
Golf tournaments in England
Golf tournaments in Scotland
Golf tournaments in Wales
Defunct golf tournaments
Recurring sporting events established in 1979
Recurring sporting events disestablished in 1981